Knight Bachelor is the oldest and lowest-ranking form of knighthood in the British honours system; it is the rank granted to a man who has been knighted by the monarch but not inducted as a member of one of the organised orders of chivalry. Women are not knighted; in practice, the equivalent award for a woman is appointment as Dame Commander of the Order of the British Empire (founded in 1917).

Knights Bachelor appointed in 1921 

The date is that on which the knighthood was first announced, either in the New Year or Birthday honours lists, or in the official notice in the London or Edinburgh Gazette recording the actual conferral.

Colonel Sidney Wishart, VD, DL, JP, an outgoing Sheriff of London, was unable to attend the investiture ceremony in November 1921 and so was invested in 1922.

References 

Knights Bachelor
Lists of knights and dames
British honours system